Livets Ord, literally Word of Life, is a megachurch  in Uppsala, within the Swedish Word of Faith movement. Livets Ord is the foremost example of the Neo-charismatic movement in Sweden, closely related to Word of Faith, and it may be viewed as a Swedish expression similar to Pentecostal elements in American Christianity.

History
The congregation was founded in Uppsala by Ulf Ekman on May 24, 1983, who also served as its leader until 2000.  Ekman passed on the local pastorship in Uppsala to Robert Ekh that year and instead began working on expanding the church's international work. In 2013 Joakim Lundqvist, become the senior pastor.

Aside from church, the movement also runs academic schools for all ages and Bible Schools.  It sends missionaries to Russia, Ukraine, Armenia, Azerbaijan, Tajikistan, Afghanistan, Israel and India.

In 2007, Livets Ord was a megachurch with an attendance of 3,000 persons. In 2016,  the attendance was 4,000 persons.

Operation Jabotinsky
In conjunction with the Christian Zionists in the United States, the Livets Ord operate a fund to supply money to Russian Jews who want to move to Israel.   The fund, named "Operation Jabotinsky", is named after Russian Vladimir Jabotinsky.

Livets Ord Theological Seminary
The congregation had its own institution of tertiary education, Livets Ord Theological Seminary, between 1994 and 2014. It was affiliated with an American institution, Oral Roberts University in Tulsa, Oklahoma, the largest charismatic Christian university in the world, accredited by The Higher Learning Commission of the North Central Association of Colleges and Schools.  Livets Ord Theological Seminary offered American Bachelor's and Master's degrees in New Testament Studies, History, Education, and other fields under the auspices of Oral Roberts University, but it was never accredited by the Swedish National Agency for Higher Education to award Swedish academic degrees.

In February 2014, Livets Ord announced its decision to close the seminary, because it had been operating under a loss for some time.

Criticism 

When it was founded, the movement met with criticism from mass media and other churches, due to what was perceived as an inhumane perspective against people who suffer from physical disabilities and financial poverty, coupled with its authoritarian leadership. Since then, the movement has consolidated, and its views have emerged as somewhat more acceptable to Swedish free churches. 

Some of its critics consider it a cult because of its connection with, and usage of theology from within, the Word of Faith movement, though its teachings now are broadened with other, more classical theology.  (See the article about Ulf Ekman).

In an article published in the Cultic Studies Journal in 1992, forty-three former students of Livets Ord Bible School were interviewed. Nearly 50 percent of the forty-three students had experienced psychosis-like symptoms, and 25 percent had attempted suicide. Also common were anxiety, feelings of guilt, and emotional disorders.

There has also been criticism, published in the Swedish paper Dagens Nyheter, against donations given to Israelis which have promoted settlements in the Israeli-occupied territories. Ekman countered the statement, saying that the donations have never gone to occupied territories, but to settlements on Israeli ground, for example in the Negev desert. The movement advocates Christian Zionism.

In November 2015, the investigative journalism program Uppdrag granskning aired an episode, hosted by Anna Lindman, that examined the financial practices of Livets Ord, including Ekman's habit of soliciting donations and honoraria in cash, as well as the exploitative way in which the organization handled its lower-level employees, contributing little to nothing to their pensions, even as those in leadership roles received lavish pension contributions.

Livets Ord have been exposed as promoting child abuse.

Ulf Ekman has been accused of homophobia.

Popular culture
A parody of the congregation exists in Berts bekymmer, where Klimpen returns to Öreskoga, now as a member of the congregation "Lennarts ord". The congregation runs a bible school in Motala, and is led by a person named Lennart.

See also
List of the largest evangelical churches
List of the largest evangelical church auditoriums
Worship service (evangelicalism)

References

External links

Official sites
 Livets Ord – Official site
Ulf Ekman – Site of the founder (In English)
Livets Ord Theological Seminary (In English)
Livets Ord Bibleschool (In English)

Other sites
 Dagens Nyheter: Ulf Ekman helps Jewish settlers
 Ulf Ekmans response to the above article
Psychiatric Problems in Ex-Members of Word of Life
 Livets Ord och dess ledare Ulf Ekman: Is Word of Life a cult? – Critical website by an ex-member. Last retrieved on June 15, 2007.

1983 establishments in Sweden
Swedish Pentecostal Movement
Christian new religious movements
Christian organizations established in 1983
Uppsala
Christian Zionism